This is a list of countries by soybean production from 2016 to 2020, based on data from the Food and Agriculture Organization Corporate Statistical Database. The total world production for soybeans in 2020 was 353,463,735 metric tonnes, up 5.1% from 336,329,392 tonnes in 2019. Brazil was the largest producer, accounting for 34% of world production, followed by the United States at 32%.

Production by country

>1,000,000 tonnes

100,000–1,000,000 tonnes

10,000–100,000 tonnes

<10,000 tonnes

Notes

References 

Soybean production
Soybean
Soybean production
Production by country
Soybeans
Soybeans